Brandon McBride (born June 15, 1994) is a Canadian track and field athlete competing in middle-distance events, predominantly the 800 metres event, where he is the current National Record holder. He competed in the 800 metres at the 2015 Pan American Games in Toronto, where he finished 9th.

High school 
Brandon attended W. F. Herman Secondary School in Windsor, ON.

College
McBride is a two-time NCAA Division I 800-metre champion and nine time track and field All-American at Mississippi State University.

Running career
In July 2016, he was officially named to Canada's Olympic team. Brandon McBride placed 14th in Athletics at the 2016 Summer Olympics – Men's 800 metres in 1:45.41.

He finished eighth in the 800 metres at the 2017 World Championships held in London.

In July 2018, McBride broke the Canadian national record in the 800 metres at the Monaco Diamond League event. McBride's time was 1:43.20.

Competition record

1Disqualified in the semifinal

References

External links
 
 
 
 
 
 
 
 

1994 births
Living people
Athletes (track and field) at the 2015 Pan American Games
Pan American Games track and field athletes for Canada
Athletes (track and field) at the 2016 Summer Olympics
Canadian male middle-distance runners
Mississippi State Bulldogs men's track and field athletes
Olympic track and field athletes of Canada
Sportspeople from Windsor, Ontario
World Athletics Championships athletes for Canada
Black Canadian track and field athletes
Athletes (track and field) at the 2014 Commonwealth Games
Commonwealth Games competitors for Canada
Athletes (track and field) at the 2020 Summer Olympics